Bed Bath & Beyond Inc. is an American chain of domestic merchandise retail stores. The chain operates stores in the United States, Canada, Mexico, and Puerto Rico.

Bed Bath & Beyond was founded in 1971. It is counted among the Fortune 500 and the Forbes Global 2000.

History
Warren Eisenberg and Leonard Feinstein worked in management positions at discount store chain Arlan's. As the company suffered financial difficulties, and the two believed that the market would shift toward specialty stores, they decided to leave and form their own company. In 1971, they opened a store in Springfield, New Jersey, called Bed 'n Bath. By 1985, Eisenberg and Feinstein were operating 17 stores in the New York metropolitan area and California. Also in 1985, the first superstore was opened, as an attempt to remain competitive with Linens 'n Things, Pacific Linen, and Luxury Linens. In order to properly represent the size increase in its retail stores, the company changed its name to Bed Bath & Beyond in 1987. The company adopted integrated computer-based inventory management systems in 1993 to better compete with Linens ‘n Things, which had utilized computer inventory management since the late 1980s.

By 1991, Bed Bath & Beyond had opened seven new superstores in New Jersey, California, Virginia, Illinois, Maryland, and Florida. By 2011, Bed Bath & Beyond had 1,142 stores.

The company went public in June 1992, making its IPO on the NASDAQ stock exchange, where its stock continues to trade under ticker symbol BBBY. Bed Bath & Beyond first reached $1 billion in annual sales in 1999.

In March 2019, three activist investment firms—Legion Partners, Macellum Advisors, and Ancora Advisors—announced their intent to remove current CEO Steven Temares and restructure Bed Bath & Beyond's current board of directors. The activist investors highlighted several instances of perceived nepotism, including the acquisition of Buy Buy Baby, which was founded by two of Bed Bath & Beyond co-founder Leonard Feinstein's children, and the acquisition of Chef Central, which was created by co-founder Warren Eisenberg's son, as examples of poor business practices at Bed Bath & Beyond. This pressure led five independent directors to step down on April 22, 2019, and also resulted in the company restructuring its board to include only 10 directors instead of the previous 12 members.

On April 13, 2019, there was a report that the chain would close 40 stores but open 15 new locations.

On May 13, 2019, Bed Bath & Beyond announced that CEO Steven Temares would step down "effectively immediately" and would resign his seat on the board of directors. Mary Winston, who had been appointed to the company's board as a result of the activist investment firms' efforts, replaced Temares as interim CEO. On November 4, 2019, Mark Tritton, who was previously Target's chief merchandising officer, started as Bed Bath & Beyond's CEO.

The company, which had for decades used coupon mailers and other promotional discounting tactics to attract consumers, announced in April 2019 that it would reduce its use of promotional coupons and tighten restrictions on their use. To combat declining profitability, Bed Bath & Beyond also announced it was creating private-label brands and opening "lab stores" that focused on home decor, food and drink, and health and beauty products.

As of 2019, Bed Bath & Beyond operated approximately 1,530 stores in all 50 U.S. states, as well as in the District of Columbia, Puerto Rico, and Canada. In addition to more than 1,020 Bed Bath & Beyond stores, the company also operated approximately 280 Cost Plus World Markets, 100 Buybuy Baby stores, roughly 80 Christmas Tree Shops (and related brands), and more than 50 Harmon stores.

Due to the COVID-19 pandemic, the company announced it would close more than 200 stores, about 21%, over two years.

In January 2021, Bed Bath & Beyond announced that they would stop selling MyPillow, citing poor sales. The announcement came in the wake of the January 6 United States Capitol attack and MyPillow CEO Mike Lindell's efforts to overturn the 2020 presidential election, and amidst similar announcements by Kohl's and Wayfair.

In March 2022, former CEO of Chewy, Ryan Cohen, sent an open letter, as part of a Schedule 13D filing, to the Board of Directors calling for Buy Buy Baby to be sold or spun off at a favorable valuation. Subsequently, Bed Bath & Beyond reached a deal to give Ryan Cohen three board seats in exchange for his cooperation and the creation of a committee to execute his proposed plan.

On June 29, 2022, significant changes to executive leadership were announced by Bed Bath & Beyond Inc. Mark Tritton left his role as president and chief executive officer and as a member of the Board, and was replaced by Sue Gove.

In July 2022, FCM BBBY Holdings, LLC, managed by Jake Freeman, also sent an open letter, as part of a Schedule 13G filing, asking the board of directors to consider their proposed plan to reduce Bed Bath & Beyond's debt and improve liquidity through a convertible bond issuance.

In August 2022, the company announced the closure of 150 under performing stores and the reduction of its corporate and supply chain staff by about 20%.

On September 2, 2022, Bed Bath & Beyond chief financial officer Gustavo Arnal fell to his death from his balcony on the 18th floor at 56 Leonard Street—commonly known as the "Jenga Building". Arnal, who was one of the targets of a class action with regard to Bed Bath & Beyond's stock becoming a pump and dump scheme, is alleged by authorities to have committed suicide.

On October 26, 2022, Bed Bath & Beyond Inc. announced Sue Gove was voted unanimously by the board of directors and would remain as the CEO.

The company opened 2023 by warning to investors that it may not survive the year. On January 5, shares of the company plunged almost 30% on the stock market, and the company announced it had "substantial doubt" in being able to continue to operate as a business. Wall Street analysts predicted that the company, as soon as the weekend of January 7–8, would file for Chapter 11 bankruptcy. On January 9, the company hired AlixPartners as its new restructuring adviser. On January 26, the company announced some banks had cut its line of credit. On January 27, it was revealed that the company would be permanently closing all of its 52 Harmon brand stores in an attempt to conserve cash. On February 10, 2023, it was revealed the company intends to cease its Canadian division, closing all stores. According to court documents, the business does not have the "capacity or ability to independently effect a recapitalization or restructuring of the Canadian operations without access to cash and the support".

Headquarters
The company's headquarters in Union, New Jersey, are located along the 7.3-mile main line of the abandoned Rahway Valley Railroad.

Competition
Since the liquidation of Linens 'n Things in 2008, Bed Bath and Beyond has had several major retail competitors, including Walmart, Target, and JCPenney. Companies such as Crate & Barrel, IKEA, HomeGoods, and the numerous Williams Sonoma companies like Pottery Barn and West Elm are competitors as well.

Subsidiaries

Current
 Buy Buy Baby – acquired in March 2007 for $67 million

Other subsidiaries
 Bed Bath & Beyond Mexico – a joint venture with Home & More to operate four stores in Mexico under the name "Bed Bath & Beyond"
 Bed Bath & Beyond Invitations – an online wedding invitation venture

Former 
Bed Bath & Beyond Canada L.P. (2007-2023) Opened in 2007 in Ontario, Canada and closed in February 2023  - 53 stores across Canada in nine provinces (none in Quebec, due to restrictive language laws)
 Christmas Tree Shops (2003–2020) – acquired in 2003 and sold in 2020 for an undisclosed amount to Handil Holdings LLC
 Cost Plus, Inc. (2012–2021) – acquired in May 2012 for $495 million, operates Cost Plus World Market and World Market; sold in February 2021 to Front Burner LP
 Linen Holdings (2012–2020) – acquired in June 2012 for $105 million and sold in 2020 to The Linen Group LLC
 Of A Kind (2015–2019) – acquired in August 2015 for an undisclosed amount and closed in October 2019
 One Kings Lane (2016–2020) – acquired in June 2016 for an undisclosed amount, sold in 2020 to CSC Generation
 Harmon Stores (2002–2023) – acquired in March 2002 for an undisclosed amount and closed in January 2023

References

Further media
Videos

External links
 

Union Township, Union County, New Jersey
Companies listed on the Nasdaq
Companies based in Union County, New Jersey
Retail companies based in New Jersey
Home decor retailers
Companies that have filed for bankruptcy in Canada
American companies established in 1971
Retail companies established in 1971
Retail companies of the United States
Retail companies of Canada
1971 establishments in New Jersey
2023 disestablishments in Canada
1992 initial public offerings